Hans Petersen may refer to:

Sports
Hans Christian Petersen (ice hockey) (1937–2009), Norwegian ice hockey player
Hans Petersen (boxer) (1930-2013), represented Venezuela at the 1956 Summer Olympics
Hans Petersen (football) at Aarhus Gymnastikforening

Others
Hans Christian Petersen (1793–1862), Norwegian politician
Hans W. Petersen (1897–1974), Danish film actor
Hans Petersen, character in All I Desire
Hans Petersen (judge) in Judges' Trial

See also
Hans Peterson (1922-2022), Swedish writer
Hans Petersson (1902–1984), German mathematician
Hans Pedersen (disambiguation)